Whitehaven Hotel is a historic hotel located at Whitehaven, Wicomico County, Maryland, United States.  It is a three-story, U-shaped, steeply pitches mansard-roofed Second Empire-style frame structure. The center core of the hotel is a Federal side hall / parlor dwelling, erected around 1810–1815.  The hotel interior retains much of its early and later 19th century woodwork.

The Whitehaven Hotel was listed on the National Register of Historic Places in 1996.

References

External links

, including historic photo, at Maryland Historical Trust

Hotel buildings on the National Register of Historic Places in Maryland
Federal architecture in Maryland
Second Empire architecture in Maryland
Buildings and structures in Wicomico County, Maryland
Hotels in Maryland
National Register of Historic Places in Wicomico County, Maryland
Whitehaven, Maryland